Alfredo Vázquez (born: 24 April 1963) is a sailor from Vigo, Spain. who represented his country at the 1992 Summer Olympics in Barcelona, Spain as crew member in the Soling. With helmsman Fernando León Boissier and fellow crew member, now, Felipe VI of Spain they took the 6th place.

References

Living people
1963 births
Sailors at the 1992 Summer Olympics – Soling
Olympic sailors of Spain
Spanish male sailors (sport)